Potassium inwardly-rectifying channel, subfamily J, member 15, also known as KCNJ15 is a human gene, which encodes the Kir4.2 protein.

Function 

Potassium channels are present in most mammalian cells, where they participate in a wide range of physiologic responses. Kir4.2 is an integral membrane protein and inward-rectifier type potassium channel. Kir4.2 has a greater tendency to allow potassium to flow into a cell rather than out of a cell. Three transcript variants encoding the same protein have been found for this gene.

The existing literature describing KCNJ15 and Kir4.2 is sparse. In spite of some initial channel nomenclature confusion, in which the gene was referred to as Kir1.3 the channel was first cloned from human kidney by Shuck and coworkers in 1997. Shortly thereafter it was shown that mutation of an extracellular lysine residue resulted in 6-fold increase in K+ current. Two years later, in 1999, voltage clamp measurements in xenopus oocytes found that intracellular acidification decreased the potassium current of Kir4.2. Also activation of protein kinase C decreased the current although in a non-reversible fashion. Furthermore, it was found that coexpression with related potassium channel Kir5.1, changed these results somewhat, which the authors concluded was likely to be a result of heterodimerization. Further voltage clamp investigations found the exact pH sensitivity (pKa = 7.1), open probability (high) and conductance of ~25 pS. In 2007 the channel was found to interact with the Calcium-sensing receptor in human kidney, using a yeast-two-hybrid system. This co-localization was verified at the protein level using both immunofluorescence techniques and coimmunoprecipitation of Kir4.2 and the Calcium-sensing receptor. Also a mutational study of Kir4.2 has demonstrated that removal of a c-terminal tyrosine increased the K+ current more than 10-fold. Because the channel has a very high open probability, the authors of this last article conclude that this increase is mediated by increased trafficking of the protein to the membrane and not increased single-channel conductance. This same line of reasoning is applicable to the initial work of Derst and coworkers.

Interactions
KCNJ15 has been shown to interact with Interleukin 16.

See also
 Inward-rectifier potassium ion channel

References

Ion channels